The Australian Open is an annual grand-slam tennis tournament.

Australian Open may also refer to:
Australian Open (badminton)
Australian Open (golf)
Australian Open of Surfing
Australian Open (squash)
Australian Open (table tennis)
Australian Goldfields Open, a professional snooker tournament
Aussie Open (drone racing)
Aussie Open (professional wrestling)